Oxlahuh-Tzʼiʼ (died on 23 July 1508) was the second Ahpo Sotzʼil of Kaqchikel Maya city of Iximche.

Biography
He was a son of his predecessor Wuqu-Batzʼ. He had a long and successful reign and lived through the reigns of two of his co-rulers - Lahuh-Ah and Kablahuh-Tihax.

Reign
Oxlahuh-Tzʼiʼ and Kablahuh-Tihax gained a victory over the Kʼicheʼ around 1491 when they captured the Kʼicheʼ kings Tepepul and Itzayul together with the idol of deity Tohil. The captured kings were sacrificed together with a number of nobles and high-ranking soldiers. After this defeat, two Kaqchikel clans rebelled. Oxlahuh-Tzʼiʼ and Kablahuh-Tihax crushed the rebellion on 20 May 1493.

Death
Oxlahuh-Tzʼiʼ died on 23 July 1508 and was succeeded by his son Hun-Iqʼ.

Family tree

Notes

Rulers of Iximche
1508 deaths
Year of birth unknown